The Battle of Reval took place on June 30, 1602, during the Polish–Swedish War (1600–1611) near present-day Tallinn in Estonia.

The Polish forces were led by Grand Field Hetman Stanisław Żółkiewski who had been sent against Swedish forces gathering by Tallinn by Grand Crown Hetman Jan Zamoyski. Żółkiewski attacked "on the march" with two squadrons of Polish hussars. The charge however was not successful.  As a result, the Swedish forces put up frisian horses as a protection against further frontal cavalry charges. Żółkiewski then sent light cavalry on a round about flanking maneuver which attacked the Swedes from behind, coinciding with another charge by the hussars. The Swedish lines broke as a result. The Swedes were led by Reinhold Anrep.

References
Leszek Podhorodecki, "Stanisław Żółkiewski", Warszawa 1988, 

1602 in Europe
17th century in Estonia
Reval (1602)
Reval (1602)
Reval 1602
History of Tallinn